The 8th Central Auditing Commission of the Workers' Party of Korea (WPK)(8차 조선로동당 중앙감사위원회)  was elected at the party's 8th Congress on 10 January 2021. It is composed of one chairman, two vice chairmen and twelve ordinary members.

Officers

Members

References

8th Central Auditing Commission of the Workers' Party of Korea